The 2017 Midlothian Council election took place on 4 May 2017 to elect members of Midlothian Council. The election used the six wards created as a result of the Local Governance (Scotland) Act 2004, with each ward electing three Councillors using the single transferable vote system form of proportional representation, with 18 Councillors being elected.

It was the first time that the Conservative party had won council seats in Midlothian since the 1995 election.

Summary of results

Note: "Votes" are the first preference votes. The net gain/loss and percentage changes relate to the result of the previous Scottish local elections on 3 May 2007. This may differ from other published sources showing gain/loss relative to seats held at dissolution of Scotland's councils.

Ward results

Penicuik
2012: 2xSNP; 1xLab
2017: 1xCon; 1xSNP; 1xLab
2012-2017: 1 Con gain from SNP

Bonnyrigg
2012: 1xLab; 1xSNP; 1xGreen
2017: 1xLab; 1xSNP; 1xCon
2012-2017 Change: 1 Con gain from Green

Dalkeith
2012: 2xLab; 1xSNP
2017: 2xLab; 1xSNP
2012-2017 Change: No change

Midlothian West
2012: 2xSNP; 1xLab
2017: 1xCon; 1xSNP; 1xLab
2012-2017 Change: 1 Con gain from SNP

Midlothian East
2012: 1xSNP; 1xLab; 1xIndependent
2017: 1xCon; 1xSNP; 1xLab
2012-2017 Change: 1 Con gain from Independent

Midlothian South
2012: 2xLab; 1xSNP
2017: 1xLab; 1xSNP; 1xCon
2012-2017 Change: 1 Con gain from Lab

Changes since the election
† On 10 January 2018 Penicuik Labour Cllr Adam Montgomery died following a short illness. A by-election was held on 22 March 2018 and the seat was gained by the SNP's Joe Wallace.

†† Midlothian East SNP Cllr Kenneth Baird resigned his seat in February 2021. A by-election was held on 25 March 2021 and the seat was retained by the SNP's Stuart McKenzie.

By-elections since 2017

References 

2017
2017 Scottish local elections